Lygaeinae is a subfamily of ground bugs in the insect family Lygaeidae.

Genera
Genera within this subfamily include:

 Achlyosomus Slater Alex, 1992
 Acrobrachys Horvath, 1914
 Acroleucus Stal, 1874
 Aethalotus Stal, 1874
 Afraethalotus Scudder, 1963
 Anochrostomus Slater Alex, 1992
 Apterola Mulsant & Rey, 1866
 Arocatus Spinola, 1837
 Aspilocoryphus Stal, 1874
 Aspilogeton Breddin, 1901
 Astacops Boisduval, 1835
 Aulacopeltus Stal, 1868
 Biblochrimnus Brailovsky, 1982
 Caenocoris Fieber, 1860
 Cosmopleurus Stal, 1872
 Craspeduchus Stal, 1874
 Dalmochrimnus Brailovsky, 1982
 Ektyphonotus Slater Alex, 1992
 Emphanisis China, 1925
 Gondarius Stys, 1972
 Graptostethus Stal, 1868
 Hadrosomus Slater Alex, 1992
 Haematorrhytus Stal, 1874
 Haemobaphus Stal, 1874
 Hormopleurus Horvath, 1884
 Horvathiolus Josifov, 1965
 Karachicoris Stys, 1972
 Latochrimnus Brailovsky, 1982
 Lygaeodema Horvath, 1924
 Lygaeosoma Spinola, 1837
 Lygaeospilus Barber, 1921
 Lygaeus Fabricius, 1794
 Melacoryphus Slater Alex, 1988
 Melanerythrus Stal, 1868
 Melanocoryphus Stal, 1872
 Melanopleuroides Slater & Baranowski, 2001
 Melanopleurus Stal, 1874
 Melanostethus Stal, 1868
 Melanotelus Reuter, 1885
 Microspilus Stal, 1868
 Neacoryphus Scudder, 1965
 Nesostethus Kirkaldy, 1908
 Nicuesa Distant, 1893
 Ochrimnus Stal, 1874
 Ochrostomus Stal, 1874
 Oncopeltus Stal, 1868
 Orsillacis Barber, 1914
 Oxygranulobaphus Brailovsky, 1982
 Paranysius Horvath, 1895
 Pseudoacroleucoides Brailovsky, 1982
 Psileula Seidenstucker, 1964
 Pyrrhobaphus Stal, 1868
 Scopiastella Slater, 1957
 Scopiastes Stal, 1874
 Spilostethus Stal, 1868
 Stalagmostethus Stal, 1868
 Stenaptula Seidenstucker, 1964
 Stictocricus Horvath, 1914
 Thunbergia Horvath, 1914 (thunberg seedbugs)
 Torvochrimnus Brailovsky, 1982
 Tropidothorax Bergroth, 1894
 Woodwardiastes Slater Alex, 1985
 Zygochrimnus Brailovsky, 2018
 † Mesolygaeus Ping, 1928

References